A superette is an alternative name for a compact supermarket or "mini-mart".

Etymology 

In French, the ette ending conveys the idea of a smaller version of a supermarket. However, supermarket has been shortened to super - leaving superette as an unusual example of a prefix and suffix with no stem word.

Usage 

The word is used in some places, particularly in New Hampshire, Hawaii, New York City, Boston, Minnesota, and the North Island of New Zealand, and is a regular expression in the French language. In France, convenience stores are usually called supérettes when those are the sole convenience stores of a small town, to portray how their supplied inventory is similar to supermarkets' but their stocking capacity is reduced to the demand of the town. It is also used in Serbian legislation to designate grocery stores with a net area between 200 and 400 m2.

References

External links 

Retail formats
Convenience stores